Nate Eight Newton (born October 9, 1975) is the American bassist and backing vocalist of the hardcore punk band Converge, the rock band Cave In, and he plays guitar and sings in Old Man Gloom and Doomriders. Newton was also a guitarist and vocalist in Jesuit and bassist in Cavalera Conspiracy

Newton was a vegetarian for several years, before he returned to eating seafood.

Career 
In 1998, Converge bassist Stephen Brodsky left the band and was replaced by Newton, who initially joined the band as a part-time member while he was still active in another band, Jesuit. Jesuit later disbanded in 1999, allowing Newton to make Converge his main focus.

In late 2013, Newton was recruited by Cavalera Conspiracy to contribute on bass guitar for their third studio album.

In 2018, Newton joined Cave In after the death of bassist/vocalist Caleb Scofield.

Equipment
Bass
  '78 Fender Precision Bass Special
  '06 Fender Precision Bass Standard
 First Act Custom Shop Delgada
 Epiphone Precision Bass
 Fender American Professional Precision Bass (Antique Olive Color) w/ Riffblasters pickups by Lace Sensor
 Music Man Stingray

Amps
 Orange Thunderverb 200
 Orange AD200B
 Ampeg 8x10 Anniversary SVT Cabinet
 Mesa Boogie 2x15 Cabinet

Discography

Jesuit 

 Jesuit (1996)
 Jesuit (1999)
 Discography (2011)

Converge 

 Jane Doe (2001)
 You Fail Me (2004)
 No Heroes (2006)
 Axe to Fall (2009)
 All We Love We Leave Behind (2012)
 The Dusk in Us (2017)
 Bloodmoon: I (2021) (with Chelsea Wolfe)

Old Man Gloom 

Seminar II: The Holy Rites of Primitivism Regressionism (2001)
Seminar III: Zozobra (2001)
Christmas (2004)
No (2012)
The Ape of God (2014)
Seminar IX: Darkness of Being (2020)
Seminar VIII: Light of Meaning (2020)

Doomriders 

 Black Thunder (2005)
 Darkness Come Alive (2009)
 Grand Blood (2013)

Cave In 
 Heavy Pendulum (2022)

Split Cranium 
 I'm The Devil And I'm OK (2018)

Cavalera Conspiracy 
 Pandemonium (2014)

Guest appearances

References

Living people
Hardcore punk musicians
American heavy metal bass guitarists
American male bass guitarists
American punk rock bass guitarists
Converge (band) members
American heavy metal guitarists
1975 births
Cavalera Conspiracy members
21st-century American bass guitarists
21st-century American male musicians
Cave In members
Old Man Gloom members